Robson is a North Eastern English surname. Notable people with the surname include:

A-F
 Alan Robson (born 1955), English radio presenter
 Andrew Robson (born 1964), British international bridge player and columnist
 Aurora Robson (born 1972), Canadian-American artist
 Barry Robson (born 1978), Scottish footballer
 Bert Robson (1916–1990), English footballer
 Bobby Robson (1933–2009), English football manager
 Bryan Robson (born 1957), English football manager and player
Pop Robson (born 1945), English football manager and player 
 Charles Robson (disambiguation), multiple people, including:
Charles Robson (cricketer) (1859–1943), English cricketer and manager
Charles Robson (aviator) (born 1895), British World War I flying ace
David Robson (1873–1926), Scottish footballer
Doug Robson (John Douglas Robson) (1942–2020), English footballer for Darlington
Eddie Robson (born 1978), English comedy and science fiction writer
 Edward Robert Robson (1836–1917), English architect
 Euan Robson (born 1954), Scottish Liberal Democrat politician
 Flora Robson (1902–1984), English actress
 Frederick Robson (1821–1864), English actor, comedian, and ballad singer

G-J
 Gary Robson (disambiguation), multiple people, including:
Gary Robson (darts player) (born 1967), English darts player
Gary Robson (footballer) (born 1965), English footballer
Gary D. Robson (born 1958), American author
 Guy Coburn Robson (1888–1945), British zoologist
 Hugh Robson (disambiguation), multiple people, including:
Hugh Robson (politician) (1871–1945), Canadian politician and judge in Manitoba
Hugh Robson (bowls) (fl. 1962–1970), New Zealand lawn bowls competitor
Hugh Robson (educator) (1917–1977), Scottish Vice-Chancellor of the University of Sheffield and Principal of the University of Edinburgh 
 Helen Walton (née Robson; 1919–2007), American wife of Wal-Mart founder Sam Walton
 Henry Howey Robson (1894–1964), English recipient of the Victoria Cross
 Jack Robson (football manager) (1860–1922), English football secretary manager
 Jenny Shipley (née Robson; born 1952), New Zealand politician
 Jim Robson (born 1935), Canadian radio and television broadcaster
 John Robson (disambiguation), multiple people, including:
John Robson (priest) (1581–1645), English Anglican priest
John Robson (politician) (1824–1892), Canadian journalist and politician, Premier of the Province of British Columbia
John Robson (Australian footballer) (1933–2011), Australian rules footballer
John Robson (footballer, born 1950) (1950–2004), English football full-back for Derby County and Aston Villa
John Robson (public servant) (1909–1993), New Zealand public servant and penal reformer
 Judy Robson (born 1939), American politician, State Senator from Wisconsin
 Justina Robson (born 1968), English science fiction author

K-P
 Karrin Taylor Robson, American politician from Arizona 
 Keith Robson (born 1953), English footballer
 Laura Robson (born 1994), Australian-English tennis player
 Lawrence Robson (1904–1982), British accountant and Liberal Party activist
 Linda Robson (born 1958), English actress and presenter
 Lucia St. Clair Robson, American historical novelist
 Luis Robson (born 1974), Brazilian football striker
 Mark Robson (1913–1978), Canadian-born film director, producer and editor
 Matt Robson (disambiguation), multiple people, including:
Matt Robson (born 1950), New Zealand politician
Matt Robson (footballer, born 1887), English footballer who played for Lincoln City
Matt Robson (footballer, born 1954), English footballer who played for Darlington
 Matty Robson (born 1985), English footballer
 May Robson (1858–1942), Australian-born actress and playwright
 Murray Robson (1906–1974), Australian lawyer, soldier and a member of the New south Wales Parliament
 Naomi Robson, Australian television presenter
 Pop Robson (born 1945), English football centre forward

R-W
 Ray Robson (born 1994), American chess grandmaster
 Richard Robson (politician) (1867–1928), Member of the Western Australian Legislative Assembly
Richard Robson (chemist) (born 1937), Australian professor in chemistry
 Stewart Robson (born 1964), English footballer
 Stuart Robson (1836–1903), American comedic stage actor
 Thomas Robson (disambiguation), multiple people
 Wade Robson, Australian choreographer
 Wayne Robson (1946–2011), Canadian television, stage, and film actor
 William Robson (disambiguation), multiple people, including:
William Robson (1869–1951), Australian parliamentarian and businessman
William Robson (1843–1920), Australian politician
William Robson (Canadian politician) (born 1864), Canadian politician
William Robson (footballer) (fl. 1895), English football centre forward
William Robson, Baron Robson (1852–1918), British Member of Parliament, law officer, and law lord
William B. P. Robson, President and CEO of the C.D. Howe Institute
William N. Robson (1906–1995), American radio director and producer

See also
Robson (disambiguation)
Robeson (disambiguation)
Robinson (disambiguation)

English-language surnames